Bab Deraz (also Romanized as Bāb Derāz) is a village in Sarduiyeh Rural District, Sarduiyeh District, Jiroft County, Kerman Province, Iran. At the 2006 census, its population was 351, in 50 families.

References 

Populated places in Jiroft County